Tigre Partido is a partido of Buenos Aires Province, Argentina, situated in the northern part of Greater Buenos Aires. The department covers a large section of the Paraná Delta and its low-lying islands. The main town of the division is Tigre; other towns include Don Torcuato, El Talar, General Pacheco, Benavídez.

The partido is bound to the north by the Paraná de las Palmas River, to the northeast by the Río de la Plata, to the southeast by San Fernando Partido, to the south by San Martín Partido, to the southwest by Malvinas Argentinas Partido and to the west by Escobar Partido.

The current mayor is Julio Cesar Zamora, from the Renewal Front within the Justicialist Party.

The partido was originally named 'Las Conchas' after a local river (now known as the Reconquista River), but became popularly known as 'Tigre' in the 19th century. Tigre was also the name of a stream and is thought to derive from the tigres or jaguars seen in the area when it was first settled. In 1952, the name of the partido was officially changed to "Tigre Partido".

A port was first built at the mouth of the Las Conchas river, which itself became known as Las Conchas. It served the islands and became an important strategic and smuggling point, targeted by Portuguese, English and Spanish invaders. The partido was officially founded in 1790, but the settlements were hit by floods and the town was moved to the present site of Tigre, at the mouth of the Luján River by 1820.

Argentine author Jorge Luis Borges said about Tigre: "no other city do I know that adjoins a secret group of green islands, which get lost at unknown waters of such a slow river that literature called it frozen..."

Colonial Times 
The history of Tigre dates back to a port on the banks of Las Conchas River, which gave origin to Las Conchas Village. The port was used by the ships sailing the Paraná River to or from Paraguay and also by those who carried wood, coal and firewood from the Delta to Buenos Aires. Las Conchas River (named after the sea shell debris that was abundant in the riverbed) is now called Reconquista and runs along Liniers street.
The hamlet surrounding the port grew as its strategic importance increased, mostly since the 18th century. By 1780 a church had already been built and the parish was established at that time.
Many river rises, floods and heavy rainstorms hit the area. One of the first historically registered catastrophes occurred in early June 1805, when Las Conchas village was almost devastated by a heavy rainstorm that made the river overflow its banks. Most of the people moved to higher nearby lands where San Fernando village was founded, and a channel was built to be used as a new port.
The village was deserted and almost completely abandoned. In August 1820 it was destroyed by a tornado once again. The rising floodwaters trapped the port entrance. At the same time the outflow of water came out through a small stream called Tigre, causing the widening of its bed
and turning it into a river. The port was then moved to its present location by the Tigre River and in time the village was named Tigre.

Promotion of the Paraná River Delta in the 19th century 
 
During the second half of the 19th century the area became economically and socially more important, mainly due to Domingo F. Sarmiento, president of Argentina from 1868 to 1872. Sarmiento insisted on the favourable development possibilities of the islands and fought for the rights of settlers to own the land they were working on. His house on the island has been turned into a museum that lies on the bank of the river that bears his name.
In those decades the country underwent a significant immigration process and many of those immigrants settled on the islands. The railway line to San Fernando, which arrived in 1863 and reached Tigre in 1865, improved communications with Buenos Aires and eased trade of Delta products, basically fresh fruit and its by-products such as fruit juice, jams and cider.
Likewise, the train allowed one-day visits by city dwellers. This favoured the setting up of places to spend the day on the islands, called recreos, and aroused interest in rowing along the quiet waters.

Island dwellers 
The earliest inhabitants of the islands were indigenous groups called guaraníes. In colonial times there was no stable population but nomadic hunters or firewood and coal seekers. Occasionally, it was also a smuggler's hiding place. From the moment Sarmiento encouraged development, new settlers came to the islands to live of the commercial exploitation of their products.
Construction materials from the islands included sun-dried bricks, rush, straw and wood. The simple huts made from these materials were followed by houses made entirely of wood.

Delta economy 

The early inhabitants lived mostly by hunting and fishing and on small palm coconuts (cocos australis). A few tribes sowed corn and peanuts, and grew fruit trees.
In colonial times the area supplied Buenos Aires with firewood and coal. Later on, fruit growing prevailed up to 1940.That year a river rise spoiled most plants and the crisis provoked a mass departure of a large part of the population. The emergence of new fruit markets in other regions  of the country hindered the recovery of this traditional economic resource.

Other regional products are wicker baskets and pieces of furniture. The cultivation of osier (salix sp), which is native to European and Asian cold and temperate regions, was proposed by Sarmiento because it can resist floods. Another plant that adapts to floodable lands is New Zealand flax (phormium tenax), which was industrialised as from 1925 and is used in containers, burlap, cords, threads, runners and mats. By the end of the 20th century, the competition from synthetic fibres made it uneconomic. Fishing and coypu breeding are other economic activities that are no longer attractive.

Modern developments in the area include apiculture, camellia and azalea nurseries, handicrafts and timber. At the Delta Products Market of Tigre, various Delta products are sold.

Islanders' social life, tourism: The "Recreos" 

Towards the end of the 19th century islanders became aware of their identity. They shared their common interest and troubles in the Delta journal, founded in 1933 by a Hungarian immigrant called Sandor Mikler. At that time 20,000 people lived on the islands and the population peaked at 40,000 in the following years.
In 1936 local producers and entrepreneurs founded an association called "Consejo de Productores Isleños" (island producers board) and the following year they declared 31 October to be "islanders day". The celebration takes place every year with  the attendance of local authorities and neighbours.
There was an intense social activities on the islands with weekly meetings at the numerous clubs in the area. Weddings were celebrated either in the coastal villages, such as Campana or San Fernando, or in the island chapels. To facilitate religious service on the islands, a floating church to sail along the rivers was set up. As the service was rather expensive it was discontinued towards 1952. The bell tower is now exhibited at the Police Station in Paraná de las Palmas and Carapachay, as a remembrance of those days.
A procession by boat was made by the first time in 1923. Even today, this feast is celebrated on 8 December, the Immaculate Conception day. The procession is headed by the image of Virgin Mary on board of a boat of the "Prefectura Naval Argentina" (national coast guard) and is followed by all types of boats, big and small, commercial and private, all of them decked out for the event. A lot of spectators applaud the march from the banks of the Luján River.

The golden years of Tigre 

Rowing was one of the main attractions that fuelled the boom of the area. Rowing practice had started in the south of Buenos Aires and little by little was moved to the Luján river due to the tranquility and beauty of the place.
President Sarmiento was present at the first regatta organised on 8 December 1873. The event was so successful that the existing rowing clubs moved to Tigre, and new ones were founded by members of the various foreign communities residing in Buenos Aires.
Yachting started to be practised in 1883, when the "Yacht Club Argentino", whose headquarters were later moved to San Fernando, was founded, and then at the "Tigre Sailing Club".  The Tigre Hotel, was opened in 1890 on the bank of the Lujan River, and next to it the Tigre Club was opened in 1912.  These elegant buildings became meeting places for the social elite of the "Belle Époque".  The hotel was demolished in 1940 but the club is still there today and has been declared a National Historic Monument.

Sports
The Delta Rugby Club is centered in Tigre Partido.

Administrative subdivisions
Tigre Partido is divided into six divisions or localidades:
Benavidez
Rincón de Milberg
Don Torcuato
General Pacheco
Tigre, Buenos Aires
Troncos (Los Troncos del Talar)

See also
 Paraná Delta

References

External links

 
Art Museum of Tigre
Parque de la Costa
Via Tigre (tourism)
Photographs of Tigre
Club de Regatas La Marina (Rowing)

 
Partidos of Buenos Aires Province
Paraná River